Ram Sewak Yadav was an Indian politician. He was elected to the Lok Sabha, the lower house of the Parliament of India from Barabanki, Uttar Pradesh.

References

External links
 Official Biographical Sketch in Lok Sabha Website

1926 births
20th-century Indian politicians
Possibly living people
Samyukta Socialist Party politicians
India MPs 1962–1967